Galatasaray SK. Men's 2011–2012 season is the 2011–2012 volleyball season for Turkish professional basketball club Galatasaray Yurtiçi Kargo.

The club competes in:
Turkish Men's Volleyball League
Turkish Cup Volleyball

Team Roster Season 2011-2012

Squad changes for the 2011–2012 season

In:

Out:

Results, schedules and standings

Preseason games

Black Sea Cup

Results

Laale Cup
Galatasaray won the cup.

Turkish Volleyball League 2011–12

Regular season

Turkish Cup 2011–12

CEV Challenge Cup 2011–12

References

2012
Galatasaray Sports Club 2011–12 season